Colin Duffy (born December 10, 2003) is an American professional climber. At age 16, he became the youngest climber to qualify to compete at the 2020 Summer Olympic Games in Tokyo, and the second American male climber to do so, after winning the 2020 IFSC Pan American Championships in March 2020.

In 2021, Duffy won his first IFSC Climbing World Cup medal, finishing third in lead at Villars, Switzerland.  At the Tokyo Olympics, he advanced to the final round of the sport climbing competition and finished in seventh place. In 2022, Duffy won his first IFSC gold medal, finishing first in bouldering at Innsbruck. Two days later, Duffy won his second gold by finishing first in the men's lead competition.  He is the first male athlete to win both bouldering and lead in the same IFSC World Cup event.

As a youth climber, he won the IFSC Climbing World Youth Championships twice, in 2017 and 2018, and finished second in 2019. Duffy started climbing at age 3 before joining Team ABC in Boulder, Colorado at age 8, where he trained under Robyn Erbesfield-Raboutou and was teammates with future Olympic teammate Brooke Raboutou.

In 2019, Duffy, age 15 at the time, completed two  routes at the Red River Gorge, Pure Imagination and Southern Smoke, in one day, while also on-sighting Omaha Beach, before completing God’s Own Stone two days later. He has also topped a -grade boulder. In November 2021, he climbed his first 5.14d (9a) route, Life of Villains.

References

External links 
 Team USA profile
 IFSC profile

Living people
2003 births
People from Broomfield, Colorado
American rock climbers
Sportspeople from Colorado
Sport climbers at the 2020 Summer Olympics
Olympic sport climbers of the United States